Pactopus is a genus of small false click beetles in the family Throscidae. There are about six described species in Pactopus.

Species
These six species belong to the genus Pactopus:
 Pactopus americanus Wickham, 1914
 Pactopus avitus Britton, 1960
 Pactopus fafneri Muona, 1993
 Pactopus fasolti Muona, 1993
 Pactopus frohi
 Pactopus horni LeConte, 1868
†Pactopus burmensis Muona 2019 Burmese amber, Myanmar, Cenomanian

References

Further reading

 
 

Elateroidea
Articles created by Qbugbot